Chung Eui-yong (born 14 April 1946) is a South Korean diplomat and a politician served as Minister of Foreign Affairs from 2021 to 2022. Chung was previously President Moon Jae-in's first Director of National Security from 2017 to 2020.

Career

A 1968 graduate of Seoul National University, Chung joined the Ministry of Foreign Affairs in 1971. He subsequently served as Korean Ambassador to Israel (1997–1998), Deputy Minister for Trade (1998–2001), and as Korean Ambassador to the Permanent Mission of the Republic of Korea to the UN Secretariat and International Organizations in Geneva (2001–2004). He was returned to the 17th National Assembly in the 2004 elections as a proportional representative for the Uri Party. In the National Assembly, he was a member of the Special Committee on United States–Korea Free Trade Agreement. He then became Secretary-General of the International Conference of Asian Political Parties. On 20 May 2017, newly-inaugurated president Moon Jae-in appointed him as the ministerial-level Director of the National Security Office. In July 2020, Chung was replaced by Suh Hoon and reshuffled to President Moon's Special Advisor on Foreign Affairs, Diplomacy and National Security. In January 2021, he replaced Kang Kyung-hwa as the new South Korean Foreign Minister.

Political activity 
In March 2018, as South Korea's Special Envoy to North Korea, Chung Eui-yong visited Pyongyang to discuss the required steps to denuclearise North Korea. He then flew to the United States for a meeting with President Donald Trump and to announce the Trump-Kim summit.

On November 4, 2019, at a waiting room on the sidelines of the ASEAN Plus 3 (Japan, China, and South Korea) summit held near Bangkok, when Japanese Prime Minister Shinzo Abe talked with South Korean President Moon Jae-in for 11 minute, Chung Eui-yong took photos, and they were published without the approval of the Japanese side.

Chung had been in charge of bilateral intelligence-sharing agreement, the General Security of Military Information Agreement (GSOMIA), with Japan.

See also
 2018 North Korea–United States Singapore Summit
 April 2018 inter-Korean summit
 2017–18 North Korea crisis
List of current foreign ministers
List of foreign ministers in 2021

References

|-

1946 births
Living people
Seoul National University alumni
Harvard Kennedy School alumni
Ambassadors of South Korea to Israel
Members of the National Assembly (South Korea)
Uri Party politicians
Experts on North Korea
South Korean diplomats
Government ministers of South Korea
Minjoo Party of Korea politicians
Foreign ministers of South Korea